Moose Hill Wildlife Sanctuary is a  wildlife sanctuary located in Sharon, Massachusetts. The property is the oldest property of the Massachusetts Audubon Society, established in 1916. It is adjacent to Moose Hill Farm, which is owned by the Trustees of Reservations.

The nature center on Moose Hill Parkway was acquired in 1990. The center displays rotating exhibits throughout the year. The sanctuary consists of habitats including forest, freshwater marsh, meadow, eskers and kettle holes. Over 160 species of birds have been observed on the property. A bird checklist is available.

Programs
Moose Hill has many public programs. There is an outdoor summer day camp for children 3 - 14. Additionally, for adults, there are various clubs and programs. For example, instructors are available to demonstrate how to make maple syrup during maple sugaring season.

Trails
The  of trails in Moose Hill include the Summit Trail, the Vernal Pool Loop, the Billings Loop, and the Bluff Trail.

The Bay Circuit Trail and the Warner Trail cross the property.

Gallery

References

External links

1916 establishments in Massachusetts
Massachusetts Audubon Society
Nature centers in Massachusetts
Protected areas established in 1916
Protected areas of Norfolk County, Massachusetts
Sharon, Massachusetts
Wildlife refuges in Massachusetts